Vanu (also Romanized as Vanū; also known as Jafarabad (Persian: جعفرآباد), also Romanized as Ja‘farābād) is a village in Kakavand-e Sharqi Rural District, Kakavand District, Delfan County, Lorestan Province, Iran. At the 2006 census, its population was 84, in 21 families.

References 

Towns and villages in Delfan County